Ebus, EBUS, or E-bus may refer to:

 Ebus, an intercity bus service in Canada owned by Pacific Western Transportation
 EBUS (serial buses), a data-bus communication interface
 Electric bus, several types of buses which uses electric power
Battery electric bus, the most common type of electric bus
 Endobronchial ultrasound, a diagnostic procedure used in Medicine
 Eastern Boundary Upwelling Systems